Ulnar–mammary syndrome or Schinzel syndrome is a cutaneous condition characterized by nipple and breast hypoplasia or aplasia. Features of UMS can be mild to severe and can vary significantly from person to person, even within the same family. The main features of UMS include upper limb defects (including abnormal or incomplete development of the fingers and forearm), underdevelopment of the apocrine and mammary glands (leading to absent breast development and the inability to produce breast milk), and various genital abnormalities. Other signs and symptoms may include hormonal deficiencies, delayed puberty (particularly in males), dental problems and obesity. People with UMS may have distinct facial features, including a wide face tapering to a prominent chin, and a broad nose.

Genetics

It has been associated with TBX3. This gene is located on the long arm of chromosome 12 (12q24.21).

Another gene that has been associated with this condition is SYNM. This gene is located on the long arm of chromosome 15 (15q26.3).

See also 
 Carvajal syndrome
 List of cutaneous conditions

References

External links 

Genodermatoses
Transcription factor deficiencies
Syndromes
Rare syndromes